David Anthony Yost (born December 22, 1956) is an American politician and lawyer who currently serves as the 51st Attorney General of Ohio. A member of the Republican Party, Yost previously served as Ohio State Auditor.

Education and career 
Yost graduated from Ohio State University with a Bachelor of Arts degree in journalism. He earned a Juris Doctor from the Capital University Law School.

After earning his bachelor's degree, Yost became a journalist with the Columbus Citizen-Journal.  He later served in senior positions within the administration of Columbus Mayor Buck Rinehart and Ohio Governor George Voinovich. Yost was appointed Delaware County Auditor in 1999. In 2003, he became the Delaware County Prosecutor.

In September 2019, Yost was one out of nine state attorneys general that launched an antitrust investigation into Facebook and Google, to investigate whether or not they were stifling competition in their respective fields.

In mid-March 2023, about five weeks after the Feb. 3 East Palestine train derailment, Republican AG Yost made the news with his announcement of Ohio's 58-count civil damages lawsuit against Norfolk Southern for its "glaring negligence" and prioritizing profits over communities' safety.

Abortion
Following the Dobbs v. Jackson Women's Health Organization decision, Yost filed a successful motion to dissolve the injunction on Ohio's six-week abortion ban. On June 24, 2022, Yost tweeted that "The Heartbeat Bill is now the law." He released a video statement on YouTube the same day in which he said, "This decision returns abortion policy to the place it has always belonged: to the elected policies branches of the governments."

Yost's son and daughter-in-law publicly criticized his actions in messages on Facebook on June 24 and 25, the former saying, "[T]he lack of pro choice is blatantly against what this country says it is on its banners and documents. The land of the free doesn't seem so free right now."

On June 30, 2022, shortly after the ban became effective, a 10-year-old rape victim who was "six weeks and three days" pregnant traveled from the Columbus area to Indianapolis, Indiana, to get an abortion to avoid carrying her rapist's child. The incident was widely reported, beginning with an article in the Indianapolis Star newspaper on July 1, and was mentioned by President Joe Biden on July 8, 2022, in comments at the White House. On July 11, Yost disputed the report, saying that neither his office or the state crime lab had any information on the matter, and that his staff had heard "not a whisper" about it; in an interview on July 12, Yost said it was "more likely that this is a fabrication". That day, the report was confirmed by the Columbus Division of Police and a rape suspect was arrested.

On July 14, Yost's office shared a backgrounder with media and on Twitter which listed specific exceptions contained in Ohio's "Heartbeat Law", and suggested, as had Yost in interviews on July 11, that the 10-year-old girl would have been able to obtain a legal abortion under those exceptions. The Ohio Legislative Commission said that nothing in the language of the law explicitly includes the age of the person seeking an abortion as a qualification for exception, and that it was unclear whether the girl would have qualified for a legal abortion.  The following week, Yost rejected calls from the chairman of the Ohio Democratic Party and others for his resignation.

2020 election 
After Joe Biden won the 2020 presidential election, Yost filed a "friend-of-the-court" brief in support of the Trump campaign's attempt to invalidate ballots cast in Pennsylvania. However, in December 2020, Yost opposed a lawsuit filed by Texas Attorney General Ken Paxton which sought to subvert the presidential election results and prevent Biden from being certified as the winner.

Personal life 
Yost and his wife Darlene live in Franklin County, Ohio. They have three children and three grandchildren.

Electoral history 
Yost was elected Ohio's 32nd state auditor in November 2010.  In January 2017 he announced he was running for Ohio Attorney General in 2018.

References

External links

|-

 

1956 births
Living people
21st-century American politicians
Capital University Law School alumni
County auditors in the United States
Ohio Attorneys General
Ohio Republicans
Ohio State University School of Communication alumni
People from Delaware County, Ohio
State Auditors of Ohio
20th-century American lawyers
21st-century American lawyers